The Piedmontese regional election of 1985 took place on 12 May 1985.

Events
Christian Democracy resulted narrowly ahead of the Italian Communist Party, which had been ousted from the regional government by the Italian Socialist Party in 1983.

After the election, the Socialists, the Christian Democrats, the Italian Republican Party, the Italian Liberal Party and the Italian Democratic Socialist Party, the Italian Liberal Party and the Italian Republican Party continued their alliance but this time the regional government was led by a Christian Democrat, Vittorio Beltrami (Pentapartito).

Results

Sources 
Source: Ministry of the Interior

Elections in Piedmont
1985 elections in Italy